William Alva Sibbetts (December 29, 1900 – March 4, 1980) was a Canadian professional ice hockey player. He played with the Edmonton Eskimos of the Western Canada Hockey League. Previously, he played circa 1922 with a hockey team based in South Edmonton (Strathcona). In 1923, he was working as a mechanic.

He also played on the Edmonton Outlaws baseball team. He died in 1980 at Riverside County, California.

References

External links
 

1900 births
1980 deaths
Edmonton Eskimos (ice hockey) players
Ice hockey people from Manitoba
Canadian ice hockey defencemen